This is a list of members of the Australian House of Representatives from 1958 to 1961, as elected at the 1958 federal election.

 At this time, the members for the Northern Territory and Australian Capital Territory could only vote on matters relating to their respective territories.
 The Labor member for Hunter, H.V. Evatt, resigned on 10 February 1960; Labor candidate Bert James won the resulting by-election on 9 April.
 The Liberal member for La Trobe, Richard Casey, resigned on 10 February 1960; Liberal candidate John Jess won the resulting by-election on 9 April.
 The Liberal member for Balaclava, Percy Joske, resigned on 2 June 1960; Liberal candidate Ray Whittorn won the resulting by-election on 16 July.
 The Liberal member for Calare, John Howse, resigned on 28 September 1960; Country Party candidate John England won the resulting by-election on 5 November.
 The Labor member for Bendigo, Percy Clarey, died on 17 May 1960; Labor candidate Noel Beaton won the resulting by-election on 16 July.
 The Liberal member for Higinbotham, Frank Timson, died on 16 October 1960; Liberal candidate Don Chipp won the resulting by-election on 10 November.

References

Members of Australian parliaments by term
20th-century Australian politicians